The Manipur fulvetta  or streak-throated fulvetta (Fulvetta manipurensis) is a bird species in the family family Paradoxornithidae.  It is named for the state of Manipur in Northeast India. Like the other typical fulvettas, it was long included in the Timaliidae genus Alcippe or in the Sylviidae. In addition, it was long included in F. cinereiceps as a subspecies, and the common name "streak-throated fulvetta" was applied to all these birds. The typical F. cinereiceps are now called grey-hooded fulvetta.

It is found in Northeast India, Myanmar and Yunnan.

Its natural habitat is temperate forest. Its status was first evaluated for the IUCN Red List in 2008, being listed as a Species of Least Concern.

Footnotes

References
 BirdLife International (BLI) (2008a) Streak-throated Fulvetta Species Factsheet. Retrieved 2008-MAY-26.
 BirdLife International (BLI) (2008b): [2008 IUCN Redlist status changes]. Retrieved 2008-MAY-23.
 Collar, N.J. & Robson, Craig (2007): Family Timaliidae (Babblers). In: del Hoyo, Josep; Elliott, Andrew & Christie, D.A. (eds.): Handbook of Birds of the World, Volume 12 (Picathartes to Tits and Chickadees): 70-291. Lynx Edicions, Barcelona.

Manipur fulvetta
Birds of Northeast India
Birds of Myanmar
Birds of Yunnan
Environment of Manipur
Manipur fulvetta